The following is a list of ecoregions in Yemen, as identified by the Worldwide Fund for Nature (WWF).

Terrestrial ecoregions
Yemen lies on the boundary between two of the world's biogeographic realms. The Afrotropical realm covers the southeastern portion of the Arabian Peninsula, as well as Sub-Saharan Africa and Madagascar. The Palearctic realm covers the rest of the Arabian Peninsula as well as temperate Eurasia and Northern Africa.

Tropical and subtropical grasslands, savannas, and shrublands
 Southwestern Arabian montane woodlands (Afrotropical)
 South Arabian fog woodlands, shrublands, and dune (Afrotropical)

Deserts and xeric shrublands

 Arabian Desert (Palearctic)
 Arabian Peninsula coastal fog desert (Afrotropical)
 Red Sea Nubo-Sindian tropical desert and semi-desert (Palearctic)
 Socotra Island xeric shrublands (Afrotropical)
 Southwestern Arabian foothills savanna (Afrotropical)

Freshwater ecoregions
 Arabian Interior
 Southwestern Arabian Coast
 Socotra

Marine ecoregions
Yemen's seas are divided into three marine ecoregions, all part of the Western Indo-Pacific marine realm.
 Southern Red Sea
 Gulf of Aden
 Western Arabian Sea

References
 Eric Dinerstein, David Olson, et al. (2017). An Ecoregion-Based Approach to Protecting Half the Terrestrial Realm, BioScience, Volume 67, Issue 6, June 2017, Pages 534–545 .
 Robin Abell, Michele L. Thieme, Carmen Revenga, Mark Bryer, Maurice Kottelat, Nina Bogutskaya, Brian Coad, Nick Mandrak, Salvador Contreras Balderas, William Bussing, Melanie L. J. Stiassny, Paul Skelton, Gerald R. Allen, Peter Unmack, Alexander Naseka, Rebecca Ng, Nikolai Sindorf, James Robertson, Eric Armijo, Jonathan V. Higgins, Thomas J. Heibel, Eric Wikramanayake, David Olson, Hugo L. López, Roberto E. Reis, John G. Lundberg, Mark H. Sabaj Pérez, Paulo Petry, Freshwater Ecoregions of the World: A New Map of Biogeographic Units for Freshwater Biodiversity Conservation, BioScience, Volume 58, Issue 5, May 2008, Pages 403–414, https://doi.org/10.1641/B580507
 Spalding, Mark D., Helen E. Fox, Gerald R. Allen, Nick Davidson et al. "Marine Ecoregions of the World: A Bioregionalization of Coastal and Shelf Areas". Bioscience Vol. 57 No. 7, July/August 2007, pp. 573-583.

Yemen
ecoregions